Hugh O'Brien (July 13, 1827 – August 1, 1895) was the 31st mayor of Boston, from 1884 to 1888. O'Brien is notable as Boston's first Irish and Catholic mayor, having emigrated from Ireland to America in the early 1830s. O'Brien was the editor of the Shipping and Commercial List and served as a Boston alderman from 1875 to 1883. He was chairman of the Boston Board of Aldermen from 1879 through 1881 and again in 1883.

See also
 Timeline of Boston, 1880s

References 
 Mayors of Boston: An Illustrated Epitome of who the Mayors Have Been and What they Have Done, Boston, MA: State Street Trust Company, Page 39, (1914).

External links
 Political graveyard information on Hugh O'Brien (1827–1895)

Category:19th-century Irish people

1827 births
1895 deaths
Mayors of Boston
Irish emigrants to the United States (before 1923)
Massachusetts Democrats
19th-century American politicians